Smarhon (also Smorgon and Smorgon Northwest) is a former Soviet Air Forces base in Belarus located 8 km northwest of Smarhonʹ.  It was a small airfield with an unpaved revetment complex hidden in the forest to the northwest. The airfield is currently abandoned and increasingly overgrown.

The base was home to the 405th Fighter Aviation Regiment between 1956 and 1960 with the Mikoyan-Gurevich MiG-15 (ASCC: Fagot).

References

External links
RussianAirFields.com

Soviet Air Force bases
Military installations of Belarus
Airports in Belarus
Smarhon’
Belarusian Air Force